Carl Fagerberg is a retired Swedish footballer. Fagerberg was part of the Djurgården Swedish champions' team of 1920.

Honours

Club 
 Djurgårdens IF 
 Svenska Mästerskapet: 1920

References

Swedish footballers
Djurgårdens IF Fotboll players
Association footballers not categorized by position
Year of birth missing
Year of death missing